Kapital Bank Arena built next to Mehdi Huseynzade Stadium (the biggest stadium in Sumqayit, Azerbaijan), is a multi-use stadium, currently used mostly for football matches and is the home to Sumgayit City PFC. It has Kapital Bank in its name due to sponsorship purposes and has seating capacity of 1300 spectators.

References

Football venues in Azerbaijan
Sport in Sumgait
FK Standard Sumgayit
Multi-purpose stadiums in Azerbaijan